Christiana North Jetty Lighthouse was a lighthouse in Delaware, United States, at the end of jetty at the mouth of the Christina River, near Wilmington, Delaware.

History
Christiana North Jetty Lighthouse was built in 1884. It was discontinued in 1909 when the new Bellevue Range Lights went into operation, but the dwelling was used for the keeper of the Bellevue Range Lights until 1937. The lighthouse and dwelling were demolished in 1939.

See also

 List of lighthouses in Delaware
 List of lighthouses in the United States

References

Lighthouses completed in 1884
Wilmington Riverfront
Buildings and structures in Wilmington, Delaware
Lighthouses in New Castle County, Delaware